Greenhill Lane is a hamlet near the town of Alfreton, Derbyshire, England, located between the villages of Leabrooks and Riddings. The majority of UK census references suggest that Greenhill Lane is a district hamlet and it was treated as a village in the 1851 census.

Hamlets in Derbyshire
Geography of Amber Valley